Monique Samuels is an American television personality. She is known as a cast member on the reality television series The Real Housewives of Potomac and Love & Marriage: DC.

Life and career
Samuels was born in Atlantic City, New Jersey. She grew up in Pleasantville, New Jersey, graduated from Pleasantville High School and briefly attended Duquesne University before dropping out to pursue a music career in Washington, D.C. Samuels married former football player Chris Samuels in 2012. The couple have three children together. They live in Potomac, Maryland.

Samuels began appearing as a main cast member on the reality television series The Real Housewives of Potomac during its second season in 2017 and departed following its fifth in 2020. She returned to reality television in 2022, starring alongside her husband in the series Love & Marriage: DC. It premiered in May 2022.

Filmography

References

External links

Living people
21st-century African-American women
Actresses from New Jersey
African-American television personalities
People from Atlantic City, New Jersey
People from Pleasantville, New Jersey
People from Potomac, Maryland
Pleasantville High School (New Jersey) alumni
The Real Housewives cast members
Year of birth missing (living people)